JEP may refer to:

Science and technology
 Java Embedding Plugin, which enables Java on Mac OS X with non Safari browsers
 JDK Enhancement Proposal, a process used by the OpenJDK community for collecting proposals for enhancements to the Java Development Kit
 Jabber Enhancement Proposals, in the Extensible Messaging and Presence Protocol XMPP
 Joint embedding property, a property of a class of models in universal algebra and model theory

Other
 Jep!, a children's version of Jeopardy!
 Jersey Evening Post, a newspaper covering Jersey
 Jersey pound, the currency of Jersey
 Journal of Economic Perspectives, a publication of the American Economic Association
 JEP (Jewish Education Program), a Jewish religious education outreach program
 Jep Gambardella is the main character of the 2013 Italian film The Great Beauty